The 2004 Lamar Hunt U.S. Open Cup ran from June through September, 2004, open to all soccer teams in the United States.

The Kansas City Wizards won the Open Cup tournament with a 1–0 golden-goal victory over the defending-champion Chicago Fire at Arrowhead Stadium in Kansas City, Missouri. Kansas City missed out on a domestic double when the Wizards lost MLS Cup 2004.

The Open Cup tournament was highlighted by A-League side Charleston Battery reaching the semifinals, one of four USL teams to beat Major League Soccer teams. The 2004 tournament was also the final edition contested using golden goal as opposed to more conventional soccer extra time.

Open Cup Bracket
Home teams listed on top of bracket

Schedule
Note: Scorelines use the standard U.S. convention of placing the home team on the right-hand side of box scores.

First round
Eight PDL and eight USASA teams start.

Second round
Six PSL and two A-League teams enter.

Third round
Six A-League and two MLS teams enter.

Fourth round

Quarterfinals

Semifinals

Final

Top scorers

See also
 United States Soccer Federation
 Lamar Hunt U.S. Open Cup
 Major League Soccer
 United Soccer Leagues
 USASA
 National Premier Soccer League

2004 domestic association football cups
Cup
2004